Fruit Heights is a city in eastern Davis County, Utah, United States. It is part of the Ogden–Clearfield, Utah Metropolitan Statistical Area. It lies along the Wasatch Front adjacent to the larger cities of Farmington and Kaysville. Its population was 4,987 at the 2010 census, with an estimated population of 6,234 in 2018.

Geography
Fruit Heights is bordered by the city of Kaysville to the north and west, the city of Farmington to the south and the Wasatch Range to the east.

Demographics

As of 2010, the total population of Fruit Heights was 4,987, which is 6.08% more than it was in 2000. There are 1,466 households and 1,285 families residing in the city. The population density was 2,184.73 people per square mile (825.0/km2). The racial makeup of the city was 95.79% White, 0.52% African American, 0.48% Native American, 1.22% Asian, 0.84% from other races, and 1.14% from two or more races. Hispanic or Latino of any race were 3.11% of the population.

There were 1,256 households, out of which 48.5% had children under the age of 18 living with them, 81.5% were married couples living together, 5.7% had a female householder with no husband present, and 10.8% were non-families. 9.6% of all households were made up of individuals, and 5.7% had someone living alone who was 65 years of age or older. The average household size was 3.74, and the average family size was 4.02.

In the city, the population was spread out, with 35.1% under 18, 12.3% from 18 to 24, 20.2% from 25 to 44, 24.2% from 45 to 64, and 8.2% who were 65 years of age or older. The median age was 29 years. For every 100 females, there were 99.4 males. For every 100 females aged 18 and over, there were 98.7 males.

The median income for a household in the city was $79,192, and the median income for a family was $82,459. Males had a median income of $62,930 versus $26,042 for females. The per capita income was $24,188. About 0.5% of families and 0.7% of the population were below the poverty line, including 1.1% of those under age 18 and none of those age 65 or over.

See also

 List of cities and towns in Utah

References

External links

 

Cities in Utah
Cities in Davis County, Utah
Ogden–Clearfield metropolitan area